The Pedlar River is a  tributary of the James River in west-central Virginia in the United States.  Via the James River, it is part of the watershed of Chesapeake Bay.

The Pedlar River flows for its entire length in western Amherst County.

See also
List of Virginia rivers

References

DeLorme (2005).  Virginia Atlas & Gazetteer.  Yarmouth, Maine: DeLorme.  .

Rivers of Virginia
Tributaries of the James River
Rivers of Amherst County, Virginia